Aadi is a 2002 Indian Telugu-language action drama film written and directed by debutant V. V. Vinayak. The film stars N. T. Rama Rao Jr. and Keerthi Chawla. The film was a huge commercial success and was remade in Tamil as Jai and in Bengali as Surya. The film won four Nandi Awards and was released in 118 centres and ran for 100 days in 96 centres.

Plot
The story is set against the backdrop of Rayalaseema. The film opens with Veera Reddy returning from the US after a long gap with his wife and eight-year-old son, Aadi Kesava Reddy. While leaving for the US, Veera Reddy gave the responsibility of managing this land to Nagi Reddy. Now back in India, Veera Reddy realizes that Nagi Reddy is misusing his power. He wants to donate all his land to the 2000 families staying in that village. When Nagi Reddy learns of this charity giveaway, he attacks Veera Reddy, killing him and his wife. Veeranna (Chalapati Rao), a trusted lieutenant of Veera Reddy, takes the child Aadi and escapes to Hyderabad. After the murders, Veera Reddy's trusted people are sentenced to fourteen years in prison.

Then the film titles roll, ending with the caption '12 years later'. The grown up Aadi is studying in college. He falls in love with Nandu  and vice versa. Veeranna has raised Aadi in Hyderabad as a fun-loving boy, but he is also a hot-tempered young man. Later on, it is revealed that Nandu is Nagi Reddy's daughter. Completing her studies, Nandu returns to her hometown at her father's place.  After a hiatus of 14 years, Aadi reenters the Rayalaseema along with other trusted members of his father, who are released from jail. Aadi wants to take revenge on Nagi Reddy and get back all the land so that he can distribute it to the villagers. The rest of the film deals with how Aadi achieves his objective.

Cast

 N. T. Rama Rao Jr. as Aadi Kesava Reddy
 Keerti Chawla as Nandu
 Ahuti Prasad as Veera Reddy
 Chalapathi Rao as Veeranna “Babai”
 Rajan P. Dev as Nagi Reddy
 Ali 
 L. B. Sriram as College Principal
 M.S. Narayana as Nagi Reddy's assistant
 Rajiv Kanakala as Rajiv
 Raghu Karumanchi as Erra Srinu / Sri Krishnananda Swamy
 Venu Madhav
 Chitram Seenu
 Raghu Babu
 Fish Venkat
 Karate Kalyani
 Ramya Sri in a guest role

Production
When Vinayak was assisting director Sagar for the film Padutha Theeyaga, producer Bellamkonda Suresh used to observe him. He promised him that he would give Vinayak an opportunity to prove himself. After Paaduthaa Theeyagaa, he was not doing much as an assistant and thus started working on his own scripts. When Suresh offered to make a film with him, he was thrilled and narrated the story to NTR. NTR liked the subject. It was a love story. But Kodali Nani didn't like it. After a couple of days, he narrated another story that was instantly liked and taken to the sets, and that was the story of Aadi. They went to Mumbai to search for a heroine. They considered Aarti Agarwal, but she had just signed on the dotted line for Nuvvu Naaku Nacchaav. They also considered Ayesha Takia, but their cameraman felt that she wasn't the right choice for NTR. Seeing the Fair & Lovely ad, Vinayak felt Trisha would be an ideal choice, but his sister didn't like her. They dropped that idea, too, with a primary belief that if ladies didn't like much, then it will just not work out. While in Mumbai still, they also met Sada also there, but she'd have been so lean beside NTR, they thought, and we dropped her too. During all this, the shooting was already in progress! Thus, we had to find just someone. That's how it all happened.

Box office
Aadi ran for 50 days in 121 centers and 100 days in a record 96 direct centers. Full Run Share Around 22cr All Time top 2 After Narasimha Naidu

Soundtrack
The music was composed by Mani Sharma and released by Aditya Music.

Awards

Nandi Awards
Best First Film of a Director - V. V. Vinayak
Best Editor - Gowtham Raju
Special Jury Award - Jr. NTR
Best Lyricist - Chandrabose

References

External links
 

2002 films
Telugu films remade in other languages
Indian action drama films
2000s Telugu-language films
Films directed by V. V. Vinayak
Films shot in Visakhapatnam
Films about feuds
2002 action drama films
Indian films about revenge
Films scored by Mani Sharma
Films about landlords
2002 directorial debut films